Estreitinho or Morro dos Homens is the highest peak on Corvo Island, Azores, Portugal. It measures  and is located on the southern rim of Corvo's caldera

The names used for the peak, Estreitinho (meaning "narrow") and Morro dos Homens (meaning "Hill of Men") are often used interchangeably, although they are sometimes used to describe different peaks, with the latter being the lower summit that one reaches first when going clockwise around the crater rim.

References

Corvo Island
Geology of the Azores